Coluzea rosadoi is a species of large sea snail, marine gastropod mollusk in the family Columbariidae.

Description

Distribution
This marine species occurs in the Indian Ocean off Tanzania and Mozambique

References

 Bozzetti L. (2006) Coluzea rosadoi (Gastropoda: Hypsogastropoda: Turbinellidae) nuova specie dalla Tanzania Meridionale. Malacologia Mostra Mondiale 51: 15–16.

Columbariidae
Gastropods described in 2006